24 Horas de Sonho is a 1941 Brazilian comedy film directed by Chianca de Garcia, starring Dulcina de Moraes and Odilon Azevedo.

Cast

References

External links 
24 Horas de Sonho on IMDb

1941 films
1940s Portuguese-language films
Cinédia films
Brazilian romantic comedy films
Brazilian black-and-white films
1941 romantic comedy films